Franklin Pierce School District No. 402 or Franklin Pierce Schools is a school district headquartered in Parkland, Washington (the facility has a Tacoma mailing address).

The district includes the majorities of Parkland, Clover Creek, Midland, and Summit. Additionally the district includes portions of Summit View and Waller and several blocks of Tacoma.

History

In 1998 voters in the district voted in favor of a school bond. In 2016 the voters again voted in favor of a school bond, this time worth $157 million. The bond needed at least 60% of the vote to pass. In 2019 the district began building three elementary schools using 2016 bond money.

Facilities
It has a  farming area for both generating food and as an educational tool. The district paid $44,000 to acquire the land in 1970.

Schools
 High schools
 Franklin Pierce High School
 Washington High School
 GATES High School

 Middle schools
 Morris E. Ford Middle School
 Perry G. Keithley Middle School

 Elementary schools
 Brookdale Elementary School
 Central Avenue Elementary School
 Christensen Elementary School
 Collins Elementary School
 The original was a Works Progress Administration (WPA) building.
 Elmhurst Elementary School
 Harvard Elementary School
 Midland Elementary School
 James Sales Elementary School

 Pre-school
 Hewins Early Learning

References

External links
 

Education in Pierce County, Washington
School districts in Washington (state)